Jerônimo de Sousa Monteiro (June 4, 1870 – October 23, 1933) was a Brazilian politician. He was a representative (in the local Espirito do Santo's Chamber of Representative and in the Brazilian Federal Chamber of Representatives), a Senator, and the 13th president (governor) of the state of Espirito Santo, a position he held from May 23, 1908, to May 23, 1912.

Monteiro, who was born in Cachoeiro do Itapemirim ES, is traditionally considered the author of the flag of the state of Espirito Santo, which is formed of three horizontal bands—a cyan band on the top, a white band in the middle and a pink band on the bottom--, and has the motto "Trabalha e Confia" (which means "Work and trust") written on the white band. "Work and trust it" is actually a shortened version for a quote from the Spanish Jesuit father José de Anchieta, "Work as if everything depended on you, and trust as if everything depended on God".  This flag was officially adopted for the Espirito Santo's flag by the times of his term as governor.

Jerônimo Monteiro helped on the improvement of the urbanization of the capital city, Vitória, adding it better services of potable water, sewage and electric power; he also reformed the port of Vitória and the public hospital of the Holly House of the Mercy.  He also tried to install an industrial zone in the regions of the state south to Cachoeiro do Itapemirim but the industrialists preferred to install in Vitória though.

However, Jerônimo Monteiro was the leader of a strong political group in South Espirito Santo, which was a group basically composed by landowners, and opposed to the more heterogeneous socially political group from the central region of Espirito Santo.  By the time his brother Bernardino de Sousa Monteiro was in his late term, Jerônimo Monteiro tried to impede Nestor Gomez, legally elected governor of Espirito Santo in 1924, to be inaugurated officially, though he could not succeed on that.

References

1870 births
1933 deaths
Governors of Espírito Santo
Members of the Chamber of Deputies (Brazil) from Espírito Santo
Members of the Legislative Assembly of Espírito Santo
Members of the Federal Senate (Brazil)
People from Espírito Santo